Macabre Caberet is an EP by My Dying Bride, released in CD and vinyl formats via Nuclear Blast on 20 November 2020.

Background
Frontman Aaron Stainthorpe said of the album:

Macabre Cabaret delves into the shadow empire of dark love and the consequences of unchecked sexuality. The deep passion of physical desire and its all-conquering rage over pure love is written bleakly here. A destructive essence within the soul can’t help but rear its ugly head. A Secret Kiss is the final and lasting mark on the soul any human will feel when the lights have dulled and nothing meaningful remains for them. All religion features a shadow creature who arrives at the point of extinction and the release of the human soul, to either guide them to majesty or allow them do fall eternally into the ether. A Purse of Gold and Stars is where we keep our hopes and desires and affection, perhaps in a dreamlike state, unattainable yet we still reach out for them. The trinkets and shiny baubles we call happiness and love are what we try so hard to keep close and protect. But it is never quite like that in real life and is often a struggle tainted with sadness but still, we hold the purse close and in tight cold hands.

Track listing

Personnel

My Dying Bride
 Aaron Stainthorpe – lead vocals
 Andrew Craighan – guitar 
 Neil Blanchett – guitar 
 Lena Abé – bass 
 Shaun MacGowan – violin, keyboards
 Jeff Singer – drums

References

My Dying Bride EPs
2020 EPs